David Alexander Callister, MLC (23 March 1935 – 27 February 2020) was a Manx politician and broadcaster, who was a member of the Legislative Council of the Isle of Man. He defeated Pamela Crowe in 2008. He was also known as a broadcaster on Manx Radio.

He died on 27 February 2020.

Early life

Callister was born on 23 March 1935 to Harold Clarke Callister and Mildred Callister (née Corrin).

Personal life

Callister was married to Ann (née Popplewell) from 1960 until his death. They had 4 children together.

References

1935 births
2020 deaths
Manx radio presenters
Members of the Legislative Council of the Isle of Man